Greenwood Urban Wetlands is a park in downtown Orlando, Florida which was created in 1991. The park is adjacent to Greenwood Cemetery. The park is the home of many animal species.

References

Parks in Orange County, Florida
Wetlands of Florida
Protected areas established in 1991
1991 establishments in Florida
Orlando, Florida